Black City is the debut album by Division of Laura Lee. It was originally released on February 4, 2002 on Burning Heart Records. It was later released on February 19 in the US and on December 18 in Japan. It was produced by the band with the help of Kalle Gustafsson and Don Alstherberg.

Track listing
 "Need to Get Some" – 3:12
 "We've Been Planning This for Years" – 2:49
 "Number One" – 2:56
 "Trapped In" – 2:54
 "Access Identity" – 2:41
 "I Guess I'm Healed" – 3:59
 "The Truth Is Fucked" – 3:38
 "Black City" – 3:40
 "I Walk on Broken Glass" – 2:01
 "Second Rule Is" – 1:35
 "Pretty Electric" – 3:10
 "Wild and Crazy" – 3:28

Personnel

Band members
Per Stålberg - Vocals, Guitar, Slide guitar, e-bow and percussion
Jonas Gustafsson - Vocals, Bass, Fender rhodes, keyboards, piano and percussion
Håkan Johansson - Drums and percussion
Henrik Röstberg - Guitar, vocals and noise.

Additional personnel
Kalle Gustafsson – additional vocals on Number One, Need To Get Some and Second Rule Is. Moog synthesizer and sound effects, producing, recording, mixing
Johannes Persson – percussion on I Guess I’m Healed, Black City and Need To Get Some, congas & handclaps on I Guess I’m Healed.
Anders Danielsson - pedal steel on I Guess I’m Healed. 
Tuomas Siirilä – keyboards on Number One and Pretty Electric. Additional Guitar on Wild And Crazy.
David S. Holloway - photography
Björn Engelmann - mastering
Don Alstherberg - producing, recording, mixing
Prof. Yaya - design

References 

2002 albums
Division of Laura Lee albums
Burning Heart Records albums